The 1912 Primera División was the first season of top-flight Peruvian football. A total of 16 teams competed in the league, The champion was Lima Cricket. This first season with organised league, covering Lima, Callao, and suburbs such as Miraflores and Barranco. José Gálvez de Lima withdrew because of not agreeing with the competition format. The clubs from Callao (among which Atlético Chalaco) did not respond to the invitation to enter. The 16 teams were divided over a first and a second level, both of 8 clubs. Cricket and Association finished equal on points; Cricket were declared champions on head-to-head record; Escuela Militar de Chorrillos withdrew halfway through the season when positioned last in the Primera División with a single point. The first match was played on 5 May 1912 between Lima Cricket and Sport Vitarte. The match was a 6–1 win for Lima Cricket.

League table

First Division

Round 1

Round 2

Round 6

Round 14

Title

External links
Peru 1912 season at RSSSF
Peruvian Championship
La Liga Peruana de Football

Peru
1912
1912 in Peruvian football